San Stefano is a village in Karnobat Municipality, in Burgas Province, in southeastern Bulgaria.

Its name was originally Ismailfak (Исмаилфак).

References

Villages in Karnobat Municipality